Clubul Sportiv Municipal București, commonly known as CSM București and familiarly as CSM, was a professional volleyball club based in Bucharest, Romania, that played in the Divizia A1.

Trophies

Domestic 
 Divizia A1 
 Winners (1): 2018  
 Cupa României 
 Winners (1): 2018

European 
 CEV Challenge Cup 
 Winners (1): 2016

Notable players  
  Alexandra Sobo
  Adina Salaoru  
  Ioana Baciu
  Roxana Bacșiș
  Francesca Alupei 
  Alexia Căruțașu 
  Kanami Tashiro 
  Kotoe Inoue  
  Naoko Hashimoto 
  Jovana Brakočević
  Suzana Ćebić
  Jasna Majstorović
  Maret Balkestein-Grothues 
  Nicole Koolhaas
  Noemi Signorile
  Zoila Barros 
  Emilce Sosa 

  Ferhat Akbaş
  Atanas Petrov

References

External links
    
CEV profile  

Volleyball
Romanian volleyball clubs
Sport in Bucharest
Volleyball clubs established in 2007
Volleyball clubs disestablished in 2019